East Lake-Orient Park is an unincorporated census-designated place in Hillsborough County, Florida, United States. The population was 22,753 at the 2010 census, up from 5,703 at the 2000 census following an expansion of its borders. The area is the home of the Florida State Fairgrounds, which hosts the Florida State Fair in mid-February of each year. It was previously home to East Lake Square Mall. The ZIP code for East Lake-Orient Park is 33610 (East Lake) and 33619 (Orient Park).

Geography
East Lake-Orient Park is located in north-central Hillsborough County at  (27.978399, -82.374017). The CDP includes the communities of East Lake, Orient Park, and Del Rio. It is bordered by the city of Tampa to the south and west, Temple Terrace to the north, Thonotosassa and Mango to the east, and Brandon to the southeast. U.S. Route 301 and Interstate 4 run through the community, crossing near the center of the CDP. US 301 leads northeast  to Zephyrhills and south  to Riverview, while I-4 leads east  to Lakeland and west  to downtown Tampa. Interstate 75 forms the eastern edge of the East Lake-Orient Park CDP, leading north  to Ocala and south  to Bradenton.

The Tampa Bypass Canal crosses the CDP from north to south.

Demographics

As of the census of 2010, there were 22,753 people, residing in the census area. The racial makeup of the census area was 42.8% White, 47.3% Black or African American, 0.4% Native American, 2.1% Asian, 3.7% from other races, and 3.6% from two or more races. Hispanic or Latino of any race were 16.9% of the population.

There were 1,998 households, out of which 35.4% had children under the age of 18 living with them, 48.1% were married couples living together, 19.0% had a female householder with no husband present, and 26.2% were non-families. 20.3% of all households were made up of individuals, and 6.8% had someone living alone who was 65 years of age or older.  The average household size was 2.85 and the average family size was 3.24.

In the census area the population was spread out, with 28.9% under the age of 18, 8.7% from 18 to 24, 29.0% from 25 to 44, 23.7% from 45 to 64, and 9.7% who were 65 years of age or older.  The median age was 34 years. For every 100 females, there were 97.1 males.  For every 100 females age 18 and over, there were 93.3 males.

The median income for a household in the census area was $34,352, and the median income for a family was $36,750. Males had a median income of $27,434 versus $21,935 for females. The per capita income for the community was $14,489.  About 11.4% of families and 14.6% of the population were below the poverty line, including 20.4% of those under age 18 and 16.7% of those age 65 or over.

East Lake Square Mall
East Lake Square Mall was a shopping mall located within the area. It was opened in 1976 and operated until 1998, when sales and customer volume declined sharply after the opening of the Brandon Town Center in nearby Brandon. The mall featured several major retailers and a branch library, which moved its operations to nearby Mango after the mall's closing. The mall was quickly converted to an office park called NetPark Tampa Bay.

References

Census-designated places in Hillsborough County, Florida
Census-designated places in Florida